Convallarin is a crystalline glucoside extracted from the Lily of the Valley plant (Convallaria majalis).

It may be obtained from the alcoholic extract of the residue from which the convallamarin has been removed with water. The alcoholic solution is treated with lead acetate, the filtrate freed from lead by hydrogen sulfide, and crystallised by concentration. An aqueous solution froths like soap and water when shaken. By long boiling with diluted acids it is split up into glucose and convallaretin.

It is probably a mixture.

Action and uses 
Convallarin causes nausea and diarrhea.

References 

Cardiac glycosides
Glucosides